This is a list of characters in the Horus Heresy, a foundational event and major component of the far future fictional universe Warhammer 40,000 created and published by Games Workshop miniature wargame company. The characters here are found and are developed in the Horus Heresy book series.

Luna Wolves/Sons of Horus Space Marines

Garviel Loken
Garviel Loken is a major character in the opening stages of the Horus Heresy and is the main character in the first three novels of the Horus Heresy series published by Black Library. He is the Captain of the 10th Company and joins the Mournival, an informal body advising Warmaster Horus, along with the other three members of the Mournival, Horus Aximand, "little Horus," Ezekyle Abbadon and Tarik Torgaddon. Horus says of Loken that he is "a precise and accurate thinker," and he is portrayed as having one of the most analytical and perceptive minds of the Legion. He anticipates the betrayal and strife that ultimately results from it, in a way none of the other Sons of Horus do. In Horus Rising he is described by other Luna Wolves as "straight up and down," referring to his strong principles and lack of humour. At the beginning of False Gods, there is some mention of Loken's ample ability to tell a story by Tarik Torgaddon and other members of the 10th company, but little is made of this gift later in the series.

Loken develops close relationships with civilian members of the 63rd Expedition Fleet of the Great Crusade. He thinks of Kyril Sindermann as his mentor and is the first to take on a Remembrancer as his personal documentarist. He is plagued with guilt following the massacre on the embarkation deck and his sympathies toward non-Astartes drive a wedge in his relationship with senior Luna Wolves such as Ezekyle Abaddon, and with Horus himself. During the events on Isstvan III, he is one of the Loyalists who take command of the resistance against the Traitors. Loken is badly wounded in that battle but survives and is later retrieved from the planet by Captain Nathaniel Garro, who is by then in service of Malcador the Sigillite.

Tarik Torgaddon
Tarik Torgaddon was Captain of the Luna Wolves Second Company. He had a sense of humour, frequently insulting other Astartes, especially those from other Legions (this started a rivalry between him and Lord Commander Eidolon and began a sparring match with the 1st company captain of the Imperial Fists). He was a member of the Mournival and a Lodge until the events of False Gods. His final appearance was in Galaxy in Flames, when he was killed by Horus Aximand on Istvaan III.

Nero Vipus
Nero Vipus was a sergeant of the Luna Wolves and a good friend of Garviel Loken and Tarik Torgaddon. In Horus Rising he injured his right hand and was forced to amputate it, later getting an augmetic replacement. He is courageous, risking his life to save others when Xavyer Jubal mutates and attacks and rescuing Solomon Demeter from a ruined bunker. Vipus is one of the few Luna Wolves left alive at the end of the Istvaan III attack, but is presumed dead after the final bombardment. His final, brief appearance is in Fulgrim.

Apothecary Vaddon
Vaddon was a loyalist apothecary. His first appearance is in False Gods. He was once in possession of the "anathame," a chaos-tainted alien weapon strong enough to stop a Primarch, which Fabius Bile took on the Warmaster's orders. He was one of the loyalists aware of the changes of allegiance, having removed Astartes bolter rounds from a deceased imperial Army commander. One of his final acts was helping to heal the Emperor's Children 2nd Company captain, Solomon Demeter. He was killed on Istvaan III by Lord Commander Eidolon of the Emperor's Children.

Iacton Qruze
Iacton Qruze, the "half-heard", was a veteran Luna Wolf. He was often regarded as "a reminder of the old days", often saluting the now wrong, old way. He is extremely loyal to the Emperor, but for some reason Horus did not send him to Istvaan III; however Loken trusts him, and Qruze helps the few survivors of a massacre on board the Vengeful Spirit escape. In Flight of the Eisenstein, Qruze helps Captain Garro and his loyal Death Guard escape. He is the only known Luna Wolf survivor. This belief seems to be confirmed in the short story "The Last Remembrancer" where he accompanies Primarch Rogal Dorn to a secret prison to interrogate a remembrancer that was sent to Terra by Horus. He is later slain by Horus aboard the Vengeful Spirit when he and a band of other Knights Errant (including Loken) infiltrate it. He is depicted as wearing grey power armour with no sigils from any legion, and claims to be under orders from Malcador the Sigillite.

Horus Aximand
Horus Aximand, "little Horus," was the captain of the 5th Company and also a member of the Mournival. Aximand was originally very loyal, but reluctantly turned to Chaos to save the Warmaster's life in the Lodge of the Serpent on planet Davin. One of his notable actions was killing Tarik Torgaddon. He was afterwards overcome with regret over this.

Verulam Moy
Verulam Moy was a Captain of the Luna Wolves. He had a close friendship with Tybalt Marr. Moy met his end on Davin (see False Gods), killed by the rogue governor Eugan Temba. It was Moy's death which caused Tybalt Marr to join a Lodge, and eventually turn to Chaos.

Xavyer Jubal
Xavyer Jubal, appearing in Horus Rising, was a Lodge member and the sergeant of the Hellebore Tactical Squad. He was angered when Garviel Loken chose to promote Nero Vipus to second-in- command of the 10th Company, after Loken had been accepted into the Mournival. His resentment for Loken and jealousy of Vipus  allowed the Powers of the Warp to corrupt him. Namely, a demon by the name "Samus". Jubal killed his entire squad, before attacking Loken and the members of an accompanying squad, killing several. The Powers of the Warp mutated Jubal into the visage of a slobbering, raging demon-beast. Jubal was eventually killed by Loken and Vipus.

Emperor's Children

Saul Tarvitz
Saul Tarvitz is a loyalist in the Emperor's Children Space Marines. He is a file officer and does not aspire to anything higher, despite being extremely competitive. Most of the troops he comes to lead greatly respect him, except Lucius, who is enraged he gets all the attention (however, this is only after the bombing of Istvaan III). Tarvitz is also liked by other marines from other legions, including Garro, Loken, Torgaddon, and Vipus. Notably, he shares a deep bond with Garro after they saved each other's lives in the past. Tarvitz will obey most orders, despite disapproving of them, and is also willing to risk himself for others, such as when Solomon Demeter is under attack from a group of Orks. After Torgadddon scolds Eidolon, Tarvitz secretly remarks that he has always wanted to do that but keeps it to himself.

Prior to Istvaan III, Tarvitz was shown works of gene-seed manipulation by Eidolon, which disturbed him greatly. Tarvitz was supposed to be on the drop into Istvaan III, but he traded places with Ancient Rylanor. This allowed him to discover preparation for the virus bombardment, after which he fled toward Istvaan III's surface and warned Nathaniel Garro and the Loyalists of the impending betrayal. He joined his Legion on Istvaan III survived for a great deal despite Lucius's betrayal. He is thought to have died during the second bombardment, dying happily with the Loyalist brothers of his Legion.

Lucius
Lucius is a warrior of The Emperor's Children. He is known for his swordsmanship. His ability with a sword is almost unequalled. He is initially a loyalist due to his friendship with Saul Tarvitz. He is sent to Istvaan III with the other loyalists to die, but thanks to Saul Tarvitz's warning about the Life-Eater virus, he is able to survive. However, his jealousy of Tarvitz combined with his desire to be reconciled to his legion drive him to betray Tarvitz and the other loyalists after he decapitates Chaplain Charmosian. Using Charmosian's helmet vox, Lucius contacts Eidolon and offers to betray the loyalists in exchange for his acceptance back into the Legion. After he convinces Solomon Demeter to kill the other loyalists is his sector, Lord Commander Eidolon penetrates the defenses of the loyalist Emperor's Children. However, Eidolon underestimates the loyalists under the command of Saul Tarvitz and is forced to retreat, taking Lucius with him. Lucius later receives the Laer sword from Fulgrim, or the demon who is possessing Fulgrim after the Dropsite Massacre. He recognizes Lucius as being "touched" by Slaanesh. Post-Heresy Lucius is known as a Champion of Slaanesh, being nearly unkillable in single combat. If Lucius is somehow defeated, he is always resurrected. If the person who killed Lucius takes any pleasure in defeating Lucius, they become possessed by the spirit of Lucius, before eventually turning into Lucius themselves.

Lord Commander Eidolon
Lord Commander Eidolon is one of the most senior (but also most disliked) Emperor's Children Space Marines. He frequently makes rash mistakes, and receives heavy criticism and retribution from other marines, including Torgaddon, Tarvitz, and even his primarch Fulgrim. He is made part of a war council, but is not held in high regard, and his presence is merely tolerated. At one point in the council, Angron threatens to kill him for speaking to him as an equal. In Fulgrim, as well as False Gods, it is revealed he had surgical implants from the Laer inserted by Fabius Bile which allow him to project a sonic scream. It is this which makes him extremely powerful, even for a Space Marine.

In the story "The Reflection Crack'd" in The Primarchs, Eidolon runs afoul of Fulgrim's increasingly erratic nature when he questions why the primarch is choosing a particular course of action. Fulgrim, believing the Lord Commander to be mocking him and planning treachery, swiftly draws his sword and beheads Eidolon on the spot. His blood and spinal fluid are dripped into the victory wine that is then drunk by his debauched brethren. However, in Angel Exterminatus, Fulgrim commands Fabius to reattach Eidolon's severed head to his body and restore him to "life", and thus Eidolon becomes known as "the Risen One".

Chaplain Charmosian
Chaplain Charmosian was the Chaplain of the 18th Company, and one of the most senior members of the Legion. He acted as a member of Fulgrim's honour guard during the later stages of corruption leading up to Istvaan III, when he was killed by Lucius.

Ancient Rylanor
Rylanor is a venerable dreadnought of the Emperor's Children. He is severely wounded some decades before the Heresy while battling the Eldar and is interred as a dreadnought. He is loyal to the Emperor, and part of Pilgrim's honour guard.
He trades places for the drop into Isstvan III with Saul Tarvitz, who is supposed to go instead. Rylanor fights against the Traitors although some believe he is sent to guard a hangar, thus providing a way to return Tarvitz, Loken, and several others back into the story. However, none of those characters, except Loken who appears in the audio drama Garro: Legion of One, have appeared since Fulgrim.

Solomon Demeter
Solomon Demeter was Captain of the Second Company, who played a major role in Fulgrim. He remained loyal to the Emperor, but was badly wounded in the firestorm on Istvaan. Apothecary Vaddon helped to heal him, and he returned to the fight against the Traitor Legions. While defending the Precentor's Palace, Demeter discovered Lucius fighting against a group of Astartes and came to his aid. It was not until only Lucius and Demeter remain that he realizes that Lucius is returning to the Legion, and he has unwittingly aided a traitor. After a short struggle, Lucius kills Demeter. In his last moments Solomon weeps, not for himself, but because he sees and understands the destruction Horus will cause.

Gaius Caphen
Gaius Caphen is second in command to Demeter. Unlike Demeter, however, he dies of his wounds before the traitors land on Istvaan.

Death Guard

Calas "Typhus" Typhon
Calas Typhon is the First Captain of the Death Guard, and equerry to Mortarion, Primarch of The Death Guard. He is captain of the space ship Terminus Est and is revealed to be in league with Erebus of the Word Bearer's legion. He is instrumental in the betrayal of the loyalist Space Marines, and places Commander Grulgor in joint-command of the Eisenstein to remove Battle-Captain Nathaniel Garro from play when the Eisenstein is due to play their part in bombarding Istvaan III with the Life-Eater virus. Post Heresy, Typhon is a known champion of Nurgle, and is called Typhus. He is the carrier of the "Hive-Plague".

Ullis Temeter
Ullis Temeter is the Captain of the 4th Company. He remained utterly loyal to the Emperor, and consequently was sent to Istvaan III with his entire company. When the viral attack came, Temeter got most men into the bunkers, sacrificing himself in the process.

Nathaniel Garro
Nathaniel Garro was Battle-Captain of the Seventh Company of Death Guard. A veteran fighter, Garro showed great skill arguing. After Commander Grulgor reveals his traitorous hand too early, Garro and his command squad defeat Grulgor. Garro later leads the Eisenstein away from the fleet, but the Geller Field fails and Grulgor and his men resurrect as the first plague marines. It is believed Garro was one of the founding members of the Inquisition.

Apothecary Meric Voyen
Meric Voyen is an Apothecary of the 7th Company, and a member of Garro's Command Squad. He remains loyal to the Emperor, like the majority of the 7th Company. After the escape to Luna he renounced his oath as an Astartes, vowing to atone for his doubts and to find a cure for the plague that changed his fellow Space Marine into the "Lord of Flies".

World Eaters

Khârn
Khârn is the equerry to Primarch Angron. During the Great Crusade, Khârn was a Space Marine of the War Hounds Legion (changed to the World Eaters after Angron took command of the legion) eventually rising to become Captain of the 8th Assault Company. Upon finding the Primarch Angron and his rejection of his new authority, officers were sent to reason with him; all perished in the attempt except for Khârn, who managed to persuade Angron that the War Hounds would submit to his desires for slaughter and become his "Eaters of Worlds".

Khârn served as Angron's equerry, providing a voice of reason to Angron's unstable rages. His love of killing was so great that he was gifted a kill-counter placed inside his helmet by the Warmaster himself.

During the culminating siege of the Imperial Palace, Khârn was at the forefront of every assault. When the battle ended with the loyalist forces victorious, Khârn lay dead upon a mound of corpses at the walls of the Inner Palace. His fellow World Eaters carried his corpse away with them as they fought their way back to their ships. Once on board they discovered that by some dark miracle, he still lived. Whether Khorne himself breathed life back into the berserker's body or whether the relentless clamour of battle revived his blood-lusting spirit remains a mystery, but since the Heresy Khârn has survived the bloodiest battles to the current age and never came so close to death again. Post Heresy, he is known as Khârn the Betrayer, and is a champion of Khorne.

Ehrlen
Ehrlen was a loyalist World Eater who took part in the attack on Isstvan III. He led a division of World Eater loyalists towards the Precentor's Palace, meeting thousands of civilians who had rallied to stop them. Ehrlen, with his fellow World Eaters, slaughtered nearly all of them. He then encountered Tarvitz, who warned the World Eaters to take cover from an incoming bombardment, but many were not able to reach the safety of cover and perished in the attack. Ehrlen led the counter-attack on Angron's forces, where he is believed to have died in combat with his traitor Primarch. However, at the end of the battle, some Loyalist World Eaters are seen alive with other loyalist forces.

Varren
Varren was a loyalist World Eater captain, who in older editions was said to have taken part in the seizing of the Eisenstein with some World Eaters, Emperor's Children (including Tarvitz), Death Guard (including Garro) Space Marines. In more recent editions, this has been changed.

Skraal
Skraal was a Captain of the World Eaters appearing in Battle for the Abyss. He killed dozens of Word Bearers before being killed by their leader.

Imperial Fists

Sigismund
Sigismund was the Imperial Fists 1st Company Captain, later the Emperor's Champion, and finally High Marshall of the Black Templars. While Garviel Loken believes that the galaxy can be pacified, Sigismund believes the galaxy will never be pacified and that mankind will be forced to continue fighting to survive. The First Captain's opinion proves correct. He is occasionally the butt of the joke, with Rogal Dorn saying, "Do not hit Sigismund. He breaks fairly easily." Despite this joke, Sigismund is regarded as one of the premier warriors in the Imperium, having battled Sevatar "The Prince of Crows" of the Night Lords legion for 10 hours without losing until Sevatar cheats. He is also a respected warriors by the standards of Lucius of The Emperor's Children. Sigismund is  present at the time of Curze's attack of Rogal Dorn. Sigismund becomes the Chapter Master of the Black Templars at the time of the Second Founding.

See also
 Chaos Space Marines
 Horus Heresy (novels)

Bibliography
 
 
 
 
 
 
 

Warhammer 40,000 characters